Abdul Malik is an Arabic (Muslim or Christian) male given name and, in modern usage, surname. It is built from the Arabic words Abd, al- and Malik. The name means "servant of the King", in the Christian instance 'King' meaning 'King of Kings' as in Jesus Christ and in Islam, Al-Malik being one of the names of God in the Qur'an, which give rise to the Muslim theophoric names.

The letter a of the al- is unstressed, and can be transliterated by almost any vowel, often by e. So the first part can appear as Abdel, Abdul or Abd-al. The second part may appear as Malik, Malek or in other ways. The whole name is subject to variable spacing and hyphenation. 

There is a distinct but related name, Abdul Maalik, meaning "servant of the Owner", referring to the Qur'anic name Mālik-ul-Mulk. The two names are difficult to distinguish in transliteration, and some of the names below are instance of the latter one.

It may refer to:

Males
Abd al-Malik ibn Marwan (646–705), 5th Umayyad Caliph, ruling from Damascus
Abd al-Malik ibn Salih (750–812), Abbasid governor and general
Abd al-Malik ibn Umar ibn Marwan (718–778), general and governor in Umayyad emirate or Cordoba.
Abd al-Malik ibn Quraib al-Asma'i (ca. 740–828), Iraqi scholar
Abd al-Malik I (Samanid emir) (944–961), emir of the Sāmānids (Persia)
Abd al-Malik II (Samanid emir) (fl. 999), emir of the Sāmānids (Persia)
Abd al-Malik al-Muzaffar (died 1008), general and vizier of the Caliphate of Cordoba, and governor of Seville and Saragossa
Abu Manşūr 'Abd ul-Malik ibn Mahommed ibn Isma'īl, known as Tha'ālibī (961–1038), Persian-Arabic philologist and writer
Abū Merwān ’Abdal-Malik ibn Zuhr (1091–1161), Muslim physician, pharmacist, surgeon, parasitologist and teacher in Al-Andalus
Abd al-Malik ibn Rabi, early narrator of hadith
Abd al-Malik Abd al-Wahid (died 1339) son of Marinid Sultan of Morocco Abu al-Hasan Ali ibn Othman
Ali ibn Abd-al-Malik al-Hindi (1472–1567), Sunni Muslim scholar
Abu Marwan Abd al-Malik I Saadi (died 1578), Sultan of Saadi Dynasty in Morocco
Abu Marwan Abd al-Malik II (reigned 1627–1631), Sultan of Morocco
Abdalmalik of Morocco (1696–1729), Sultan of Morocco
Anwar bin Abdul Malik (1898–1998), Malaysian politician
Haji Abdul Malik Karim Amrullah (1908–1981), Indonesian Muslim scholar
Abdul Malek Ukil (1924–1987), Bangladeshi lawyer and politician
Ahmed Abdul-Malik (1927–1993), Sudanese-American jazz musician
Abdul Malik, Bangladeshi Brigadier (rtd.) (born 1929), first Pakistani cardiologist, founder of National Heart Foundation
Abdul Malik, name used by Michael X (1933–1975), Trinidadian black revolutionary
Abdul Malik (athlete) (born 1939), Pakistani sprinter
Abdulmalik Dehamshe (born 1943), Arab-Israeli politician
Abdul Malik Mujahid (born 1951), Pakistani-American imam
 Abdelmalek Droukdel (born 1970), Algerian al-Qaeda member
Abdulmalik Mohammed (born 1973), Kenyan suspected of hotel bombing, held in Guantanamo
Abd al Malik (rapper) (born 1975), Congolese-French rapper
Abdul Malik Mydin (born 1975), Malaysian swimmer
Abdul-Malik al-Houthi (born 1979), Yemeni rebel
Ahmed Eid Abdel Malek (born 1980), Egyptian footballer
Abdelmalek Cherrad (born 1981), Algerian footballer
 Abdelmalek Djeghbala (born 1983), Algerian footballer
Abdolmalek Rigi (ca. 1983–2010), Iranian Sunni militant
Abdul Malik (born 1983), Prince of Brunei
Abdelmalek Ziaya (born 1984), Algerian footballer
Abdelmalek Mokdad (born 1985), Algerian footballer
Abdul-Malik Abu (born 1995), American basketball player in the Israeli Premier Basketball League
Abdul Malik Jaber, Palesinain businessman
Johari Abdul-Malik, American imam
Abdul Malik Pahlawan, Afghan militia leader who led his forces for both the Taliban and Northern Alliance
Abdul Malik (Sergeant), Ghanaian military officer
Abdul Malik (cricketer), Afghan cricketer
 Zainal Abidin Abdul Malik, Singaporean murderer

Females
 Hanadi Tayseer Abdul Malek Jaradat, or just Hanadi Jaradat (1975–2003), Palestinian suicide bomber

Places
Ramadan Ben-Abdelmalek Stadium, stadium in Constantine, Algeria

References

Arabic masculine given names
Iranian masculine given names